The cantons of Bordeaux are administrative divisions of the Gironde department, in southwestern France. Since the French canton reorganisation which came into effect in March 2015, the city of Bordeaux is subdivided into 5 cantons. Their seat is in Bordeaux.

Cantons

References

Cantons of Gironde